Ken Casner (January 23, 1930 – August 19, 2009) was an American football defensive tackle. He played for the Los Angeles Rams in 1952.

References

1930 births
2009 deaths
American football defensive tackles
Baylor Bears football players
Los Angeles Rams players